Penica peritheta is a moth of the family Gracillariidae. It is known from Mexico.

References

Gracillariinae